Defending champion David Wagner defeated Lucas Sithole in the final, 3–6, 7–5, 6–3 to win the quad singles wheelchair tennis title at the 2014 Australian Open.

Seeds
  David Wagner (champion)
  Lucas Sithole (final)

Draw

Final

Round robin
Standings are determined by: 1. number of wins; 2. number of matches; 3. in two-players-ties, head-to-head records; 4. in three-players-ties, percentage of sets won, or of games won; 5. steering-committee decision.

References
 Draw

Wheelchair Quad Singles
2014 Quad Singles